Debbie McCune Davis (born August 12, 1951)  is a Democratic politician in the United States. She has served as Arizona State Senator for District 14 from 2006 to 2017. Earlier she was a member of the Arizona House of Representatives from 1979 through 1994, and from 2003 through 2006.

External links
 Senator Debbie McCune Davis – District 14 official State Senate website
 Profile at Project Vote Smart
 Follow the Money – Debbie McCune Davis
 2008 2006 State Senate campaign contributions
 2004 2002 State House campaign contributions
 1996 Commissioner campaign contributions

1951 births
Living people
Democratic Party Arizona state senators
Democratic Party members of the Arizona House of Representatives
Women state legislators in Arizona
Arizona State University alumni
21st-century American politicians
21st-century American women politicians
Politicians from Phoenix, Arizona